Jacob Stephanus "Japie" Louw (30 August 1867 – 17 August 1936) was a South African international rugby union player.

Biography
Born in Durbanville, Louw attended Paul Roos Gymnasium before playing provincial rugby for Transvaal (now known as the Golden Lions). He made his only appearances for South Africa during Great Britain's 1891 tour, South Africa's first as a Test nation. The series was won 3–0 by Great Britain, Louw played as a forward in all three Tests. He died in 1936, in Bloemfontein, at the age of 68.

Test history

See also
List of South Africa national rugby union players – Springbok no. 11

References

South Africa international rugby union players
South African rugby union players
1867 births
1936 deaths
Rugby union players from the Western Cape
Rugby union forwards
Golden Lions players